La Patrie was a French daily conservative newspaper of the July Monarchy and later the Second French Empire, and a staunch supporter of the French Imperial regime. It continued under the French Third Republic.

La Patrie, was a newspaper founded by Auguste Lireux in 1841. Its offices were located at 12 rue du Croissant, and known as République du Croissant as it included head offices of a number of publications. Its offices also overlooked la rue des Jeûneurs, with its textile, fabrics and clothes shops.

The journal with strong financial and economic coverage saw a great surge in readership when banker and deputee Théodore Casimir Delamarre took over the daily passing from an average 4,000 copies in 1846, to 20,000 copies in the mid 1850s and to 35,000 copies in 1861.

Newspapers established in 1841
1841 establishments in France
Defunct newspapers published in France
Newspapers published in Paris
Daily newspapers published in France